Bathan Khurd is a small village in the Fatehgarh Sahib district in the Indian State of Punjab.

References

 http://censusindia.gov.in/Dist_File/datasheet-0308.pdf

Villages in Fatehgarh Sahib district